Valcourt may refer to:

Places
Valcourt (city), a city in Quebec, Canada 
Valcourt (township), surrounding the city of Valcourt
Valcourt, Haute-Marne, a commune in the Haute-Marne department, France

People
Bernard Valcourt (born 1952), Canadian politician and lawyer
David P. Valcourt (born 1951), United States Army general

See also
Valcour (disambiguation)